The 2006 FIFA World Cup qualification UEFA Group 6 was a UEFA qualifying group for the 2006 FIFA World Cup. The group comprised Austria, Azerbaijan, England, Northern Ireland, Poland and Wales.

The group was won by England, who qualified for the 2006 FIFA World Cup. The runners-up Poland also qualified as one of two best runners-up.

Standings

Results

Goalscorers

7 goals
 Tomasz Frankowski
 Maciej Żurawski

5 goals
 Frank Lampard

4 goals
 Michael Owen
 Jacek Krzynówek

3 goals
 René Aufhauser
 Markus Schopp
 David Healy
 Ryan Giggs

2 goals

 Roland Kollmann
 Roland Linz
 Martin Stranzl
 David Beckham
 Joe Cole
 Steven Gerrard
 Stuart Elliott
 Kamil Kosowski
 Marek Saganowski
 Robert Earnshaw
 John Hartson

1 goal

 Andreas Ivanschitz
 Christian Mayrleb
 Ivica Vastić
 Rəşad Sadıqov
 Jermain Defoe
 Steven Davis
 Warren Feeney
 Keith Gillespie
 Colin Murdock
 Jeff Whitley
 Euzebiusz Smolarek
 Radosław Kałużny
 Tomasz Kłos
 Piotr Włodarczyk
 Simon Davies
 Carl Robinson
 Gary Speed

1 own goal
 Aftandil Hacıyev (playing against Poland)
 Arkadiusz Głowacki (playing against England)

See also 

6
2004–05 in English football
Qual
2004–05 in Welsh football
2005–06 in Welsh football
2004–05 in Northern Ireland association football
2005–06 in Northern Ireland association football
2004–05 in Austrian football
2005–06 in Austrian football
2004–05 in Polish football
Qual
2004–05 in Azerbaijani football
2005–06 in Azerbaijani football